Antonio Huertas Mejías (born January 18, 1964 in Villanueva de la Serena) is a Spanish manager who has been the chairman and CEO of Mapfre since December 2011. He is a non-executive director of Consorcio de Compensacion de Seguros.

Career 
Under Huerta’s leadership, Mapfre announced in 2022 that it would no longer insure or invest in oil, gas and coal producers unless they have a plan to transition from fossil fuels.

Other activities 
 Geneva Association, Member of the Board of Directors

References 

Spanish chief executives
University of Salamanca alumni
Living people
1964 births
People from the Province of Badajoz